Rosemary Quispe (born 20 August 1983) is a Bolivian long distance runner. She qualified for the 2016 Summer Olympics at the 2016 Hamburg Marathon, which was her first official marathon race. She finished 117th at the 2016 Olympics in a time of 2:58:32.

References

External links

 

1983 births
Living people
Bolivian female long-distance runners
Bolivian female marathon runners
Athletes (track and field) at the 2015 Pan American Games
Pan American Games competitors for Bolivia
Athletes (track and field) at the 2016 Summer Olympics
Olympic athletes of Bolivia
Sportspeople from La Paz